F.C. Terborgh (14 January 1902 in Den Helder – 26 February 1981 in Linho Sintra), was the pseudonym of Reijnier Flaes, a Dutch diplomat, prose writer and poet.  He was the 1971 recipient of the Constantijn Huygens Prize.

Works
 1929 - Das Problem der Territorialkonflikte (dissertation)
 1940 - De condottiere
 1947 - Het gezicht van Peñafiel
 1949 - Slauerhoff. Herinneringen en brieven
 1954 - De meester van de Laërtes
 1958 - Padroëns
 1962 - Sierra Solana
 1964 - De Turkenoorlog
 1969 - Abyla
 1970 - Odysseus' laatste tocht
 1972 - Verhalen

References
Profile at the Digital library for Dutch literature

1902 births
1981 deaths
Dutch male poets
20th-century Dutch diplomats
People from Den Helder
Constantijn Huygens Prize winners
20th-century Dutch poets
20th-century Dutch male writers